Ghugni or ghuguni or  guguniis a curry made of peas or chickpeas. Different variations of the dish use different types of peas or chickpeas, such as black gram, green peas, or white peas. It is a snack native to the Indian subcontinent, especially popular in Eastern India (Indian States of Jharkhand, Odisha, West Bengal), Northeast India (Indian states of Assam and Tripura) and in Bangladesh.

Preparation 
 
The peas are soaked overnight and then boiled in water. The peas are added to a gravy that includes coconut, ginger paste, garlic paste, cumin, tamarind paste, and cilantro.   

It is then served with puffed rice (kurmura) and at times with hot onion pakoda or bhajiya.   

Ghugni is often served with dhuska, a fermented rice-lentil dish. In Calcutta, ghugni is often eaten with puris.

Variation 

In Bihar, green chickpeas or freshly harvested green peas are used for the dish. They are lightly pan fried in mustard oil with some cumin seeds and green chillies and are not curried like eastern Indian versions. In Bengal, ghugni is made from dry white peas.

Some versions include meat, such as goat or even lamb or chicken. The meat is usually minced or in bite-sized pieces, mostly for flavoring. "Mangsher ghugni" or meat keema ghugni has been described as a "Kolkata trademark".

See also
 Chhole
 Bhel

References

External links
 Ghugni recipe
 Bangla Recipe

Indian snack foods
Odia cuisine
Bengali cuisine
Bihari cuisine
Legume dishes
Vegetarian dishes of India